Stéphane Roy (born June 29, 1967) is a Canadian former professional ice hockey player who played 12 games in the National Hockey League (NHL) with the Minnesota North Stars during the 1987–88 season. The rest of his career, which lasted from 1987 to 2003, was spent in various minor leagues.

Biography
Roy was born in Quebec City, Quebec, and raised in Cap-Rouge, Quebec. He is the younger brother of Hockey Hall of Fame goaltender Patrick Roy. As a youth, he played in the 1978, 1979 and 1980 Quebec International Pee-Wee Hockey Tournaments with a minor ice hockey team from Quebec City, and was a teammate to his brother Patrick in the 1978 event.

Roy was drafted by the Minnesota North Stars in 1985, in the third round (51st overall). He played with the North Stars in the 1987–88 season, scoring one goal in twelve games and accumulating zero penalty minutes. He also spent several stints with the Canadian National Team during the first half of his career, making the team five times in a seven-year span (1986–93).

Career statistics

Regular season and playoffs

International

References

External links

1967 births
Living people
Abilene Aviators players
Les Aigles de Nice players
Anchorage Aces players
Canadian ice hockey centres
Canadian people of French descent
Canadian people of Irish descent
Chicoutimi Saguenéens (QMJHL) players
EHC Olten players
Denver Daredevils players
French Quebecers
Granby Bisons players
Halifax Citadels players
Ice hockey people from Quebec City
Kalamazoo Wings (1974–2000) players
Macon Whoopee (CHL) players
Memphis RiverKings players
Minnesota North Stars draft picks
Minnesota North Stars players
Neuchâtel Young Sprinters HC players
Quebec people of Irish descent